Klepikovo is a rural locality (a selo) and the administrative center of Klepikovsky Selsoviet, Ust-Pristansky District, Altai Krai, Russia. The population was 430 as of 2013. There are 8 streets.

References 

Rural localities in Ust-Pristansky District